Last Call is a 1991 American erotic thriller film about a woman who decides to take revenge on an estate agent who killed her mother. The film was directed by Jag Mundhra, and stars William Katt, Shannon Tweed, and Joseph Campanella.

Cast 
 Shannon Tweed as Cindy and Audrey
 William Katt as Paul

Home media 
The film was initially released on VHS and LaserDisc in R-rated and unrated versions. The unrated version featured extended sex scenes between Tweed and Katt. It did not see DVD release until 2019, when MVD released the R-rated cut as a double pack with Bitter Harvest.

External links
 

1991 films
1990s exploitation films
1990s erotic thriller films
American exploitation films
American erotic thriller films
1990s English-language films
Films directed by Jag Mundhra
1990s American films